Gloria is a 1999 American neo-noir crime thriller film directed by Sidney Lumet and stars Sharon Stone as Gloria. It is a remake of the 1980 film of the same name that was written and directed by John Cassavetes. It is also notable as George C. Scott's final theatrically released film.  The supporting cast also includes Jeremy Northam, Cathy Moriarty-Gentile, Bonnie Bedelia, and Barry McEvoy. The music score is composed by Academy Award winner Howard Shore.

Plot
Gloria has just gotten out of prison, where she has served three years to save her boyfriend, Kevin. During her stay in prison, she thinks about how Kevin never once visited her. She tells Kevin that the relationship is over and that all she wants is the money he promised her for taking the rap for him. He refuses to give it to her.

Meanwhile, the gang's accountant has tried to protect himself by creating a computer disk with the names of all those involved in the outfit's criminal activities. The plan backfires, and—in trying to get the disk—one of Kevin's trigger-happy henchmen kills the accountant, his wife, his mother-in-law and his daughter. Only his seven-year-old son Nicky escapes, but is quickly caught and brought to Kevin's apartment. It is there that Gloria and Nicky meet. Gloria must decide whether or not to risk her life in order to save the boy.

Gloria begins to feel love for the young boy as his innocence and intelligent nature inspires her. She tells him that she hates kids and that is why she doesn’t have kids. She lectures him to get used to this world and to grow up on his own. She then tries to ditch him in a subway, but Nicky comes back. As Gloria and Nicky spend more time together, they both develop feelings for each other. The boy sees news reports of his family being killed by the mob and runs away from the hotel room he and Gloria were staying in. Gloria follows in pursuit and Nicky gets on the train to go back to his family's apartment. Unable to catch Nicky before he gets on the train; Gloria is frantic and tells the cops her kid is on that train heading to 158th Street. After the cops apprehend Nicky, he and Gloria go back to the hotel room and Gloria gives Nicky a bath. Lying awake Gloria hears Nicky wake up. He asks "Did it really happen?"

Cast
 Sharon Stone as Gloria Swenson
 Jean-Luke Figueroa as Nicky Nunez
 Jeremy Northam as Kevin
 Cathy Moriarty-Gentile as Diane
 George C. Scott as Reuben "Ruby"
 Mike Starr as Sean
 Bonnie Bedelia as Brenda
 Barry McEvoy as Terry
 Don Billett as Raymond
 Jerry Dean as Mickey
 Tony DiBenedetto as Zach
 Teddy Atlas as Ian
 Bobby Cannavale as Jack Jesus Nunez
 Sarita Choudhury as Angela Nunez
 Míriam Colón as Maria Nunez
 Desiree Casado as Luz Nunez

Reception
The movie received generally negative reviews. The film was also a box office bomb grossing only $4,197,729 at the North American box office despite its $30 million budget. Gloria currently holds a 14% rating on Rotten Tomatoes based on 29 reviews.

References

External links
 
 
 
 
 
 

1999 films
American drama films
1999 drama films
Films set in New York City
Films about organized crime in the United States
Columbia Pictures films
Films directed by Sidney Lumet
Remakes of American films
Films scored by Howard Shore
Mandalay Pictures films
1990s English-language films
1990s American films